Fever for Heights is a 1924 German silent film directed by Gernot Bock-Stieber and starring Sascha Gura, Hanni Reinwald and Erich Kaiser-Titz.

The film's sets were designed by the art director Carl Ludwig Kirmse.

Cast
 Hanni Reinwald
 Sascha Gura
 Erich Kaiser-Titz
 Bengt Aage
 Björn Hvid
 Robert Scholz

References

Bibliography
 Alfred Krautz. International directory of cinematographers, set- and costume designers in film, Volume 4. Saur, 1984.

External links

1924 films
Films of the Weimar Republic
German silent feature films
Films directed by Gernot Bock-Stieber
German black-and-white films
1920s German films